Gustavo França Borges (born December 2, 1972) is a Brazilian former competitive swimmer. He swam for Brazil in the Summer Olympic Games in: 1992, 1996, 2000 and 2004. Borges has won the second-most Olympic medals of any Brazilian, with fourone in 1992, two in 1996 and one in 2000behind sailors Robert Scheidt and Torben Grael. He also has the third-most Pan American Games gold medals of any Brazilian, with eightbehind swimmer Thiago Pereira and table tennis player Hugo Hoyama. Borges was Brazil's flagbearer for the Closing Ceremony at the 2004 Summer Olympics.

Borges' first medal was silver, which he won in the 100-meter freestyle at the 1992 Olympics, which he received after a delay because his lane's timer was not working, and the judges had to review video recordings of the race to verify his place. Borges even overcame his idol, Matt Biondi, to win the silver medal.

Borges lives in São Paulo, where he runs his own swimming school. He used to live in the United States in Jacksonville, Florida and in Ann Arbor, Michigan while he was still a student. He attended university at the University of Michigan in the mid-1990s, where he swam for the university's team, coached by Jon Urbanchek and graduated with a degree in Economics. His teammates at Michigan included Eric Namesnik and Marcel Wouda in the mid-1990s.

Beginning 
Borges was born in Ribeirão Preto, Brazil, but lived in Ituverava throughout his childhood. In 1981, at the age of nine, he represented his school, coming third place in a race of 50-meter freestyle, his first podium finish. Before this, he had participated in swimming lessons at Associação Atlética Ituveravense. In 1984, in São João da Boa Vista, Gustavo won his first medal in official competitions in a 100-meter breaststroke race. Borges was a runner-up of the São Paulo state, and runner-up of the Teto Olímpico at breaststroke, category 11/12 years.

In 1987, Borges was 15 years old and swimming for the Associação Atlética Francana. He won the bronze medal in the 100-meter freestyle and silver in the 50-meter freestyle at the São Paulo Swimming Championship, Youth category A / B. In this year, Borges left Ituverava, moved to São Carlos and defended the São Carlos Clube. In 1988, at the São Paulo's Summer Youth Championship, he was a champion in the 50-meter freestyle and silver in the 100-meter freestyle. Borges' times were already good enough to participate in the Brazilian Championship, Júlio Delamare Trophy.

International career

1989: National prominence 
In 1989, after joining the Esporte Clube Pinheiros, Gustavo Borges began to gain national fame; when he was only 17 years old, he began beating the swimmer Cristiano Michelena, which held hegemony in the 100-meter and 200-meter in Brazil. He won the Brazil Trophy, the biggest tournament in the country, winning two gold medals in the 50-meter and 100-meter freestyle.

1990: Steps to the outside 
In 1990, Borges began to succeed in international competitions. In the South American championship held in Rosario, Argentina, he won gold in all three events he competed in; the 50-meter freestyle, the 4×100-meter freestyle and the 4×200-meter freestyle. In July, at the Jose Finkel Trophythe Brazilian short course championshiphe became the first Brazilian to make the 100-meter freestyle under 49 seconds with a time of 48.59 seconds, and was summoned to swim in the 1991 World Aquatics Championships in Perth, Australia. The same year, indicated by Maria Lenk, Borges went to the United States to study at Bolles School in Jacksonville, Florida.

1991: Pan Champion 
At the 1991 World Aquatics Championships, Borges finished in 12th in the 100-meter freestyle, breaking the South American record with a time of 50.77 seconds, and also in the 50-meter freestyle (23.15 seconds). He also finished 28th in the 200-meter freestyle. Borges won his first important international medals in the 1991 Pan American Games in Havana. He won the 100-meter freestyle where he set a Pan Am Games record, and was silver medalist in 200-meter freestyle and bronze in the 50-meter freestyle, breaking the South American record. He also won gold in the 4×100-meter freestyle, and silver in the 4×200-meter freestyle.

1992: From Brazil, to the World 
In 1992, Gustavo Borges broke the Brazilian Olympic medals fasting in swimming, which was set at the 1984 Summer Olympics when Ricardo Prado won the silver in the 400-meter individual medley. Participating in his first Olympics the 1992 Summer Olympics in Barcelona, Borges won the silver medal in the 100-meter freestyle with a time of 49.43 seconds, a South American record, losing the gold to Alexander Popov. Borges was ranked sixth in the 4×100-meter freestyle, seventh in the 4×200-meter freestyle, 13th in the 50-meter freestyle and 22nd in the 200-meter freestyle.

1993: Champion, and World Record holder 
In 1993, Borges broke three world records on the short course. The first was on July 2, at the Jose Finkel Trophy in Santos, Brazil. Borges's time was 47.94 seconds in the 100-metre freestyle, setting a record that lasted until January 1, 1994, when it broken by Alexander Popov. On July 7, the Brazilian team comprising Fernando Scherer, Teófilo Ferreira, José Carlos Souza and Gustavo Borges broke the world record in the 4×100-meter freestyle with a time of 3:13.97; the previous record time of 3:14.00.had been set by Sweden on March 19, 1989. On December 5, Brazil again beat the world record with the same team, with a time of 3:12.11. This mark was achieved in 1993 FINA World Swimming Championships (25 m), which Borges won. He also won gold in the 4×100-meter freestyle, silver in the 100-meter freestyle and bronze in 4×200-meter freestylebreaking the South American record with a time of 7:09.38. He also finished fifth in the 4×100-meter medley, along with Maurício Menezes, José Carlos Souza and Rogério Romero, and fifth in the 200-meter freestyle.

1994: Two bronzes 
At the September 1994 World Aquatics Championships in Rome, Borges won bronze in the 100-meter freestyle and in the 4×100-meter freestyle relay. He also finished fourth in the 50-meter freestyle and 11th in the 200-meter freestyle.

1995: Two-times World and Pan champion  
1995 was an important year for Borges. In March at the 1995 Pan American Games held in Argentina, he became two-time champion of the 100-meter freestyle and won gold in the 200-meter freestyle, both with Pan Am Games records. He won two more silver medals in the 4×100-meter and 4×200-meter freestyle events. In August, he went to the 1995 Summer Universiade, where he won two silver medals in the 100-meter freestyle and 4×100-meter freestyle. At the end of the year, at the 1995 FINA World Swimming Championships (25 m) in Rio de Janeiro, Borges became two-time 4×100-meter freestyle champion. He also won the 200-meter freestyle gold, breaking the South American record, with a time of 1:45.55, silver in the 100-meter freestyle and bronze in the 4×200-meter freestyle.

1996: Two Olympic medals 
Borges participated in the 1996 Summer Olympics in Atlanta, and became the first Brazilian to win three Olympic medals, a feat achieved by Torben Grael in the same games. Borges won the silver medal in the 200-meter freestyle with a time of 1:48.08, and bronze in the 100-meter freestyle with a time of 49.02 seconds, both South American records. The 100-meter freestyle record was only beaten by Fernando Scherer in August 1998, and the 200-metre freestyle was only beaten by Rodrigo Castro in 2008. Borges also finished fourth in the 4×100-meter freestyle and 12th in the 50-meter freestyle.

1997: The fourth World's gold 
At the 1997 FINA World Swimming Championships (25 m), Borges won gold in the 200-meter freestyle and silver in the 100-meter freestyle. He also finished sixth in the 50-meter freestyle.

1998: The fourth World Record 
At the 1998 World Aquatics Championships in Perth, Australia, Borges finished fifth in the 100-meter freestyle, eighth in the 200-meter freestyle and sixth in the 4×100-meter freestyle. At the end of 1998, Borges was part of the Brazilian team which broke its third consecutive world record in the 4×100-metre freestyle relay on short course. On December 20, shortly after the end of the Jose Finkel Trophy, Fernando Scherer, Carlos Jayme, Alexandre Massura and Gustavo Borges, in order, fell the pool at Club de Regatas Vasco da Gama with a time of 3:10.45, which would only be broken in 2000 by the Swedish team. At the same tournament, Borges also broke the South American record in the 100-meter freestyle in short course with a time of 47.14 seconds and the 200-meter freestyle record with a time of 1:44.40the last record-breaking swims of his career.

1999: The best Pan 
In the 1999 Pan American Games in Winnipeg, Borges led Brazil to its best  Pan American Games swimming result of all time. In the 4×100-meter medley, a team comprising Borges, Alexandre Massura, Fernando Scherer and Marcelo Tomazini won the medley relay for the first time in the Pan's history with a time of 3:40.27, breaking the  Pan American Games and South American records and securing a place in the 2000 Summer Olympics. He also won the gold in the 200-meter freestyle and 4×100-meter freestylebreaking the South American recordsilver in the 4×200-meter freestylealso breaking the South American recordbronze in the 100-meter freestyle, and finished fourth in the 50-meter freestyle. In this tournament, he joined Hugo Hoyama and Claudio Kano as Brazilians who won the most gold medals in the event's history, with seven each. Borges also broke the national record for medals at the Games, with 15l. This year, Borges' first son, Luiz Gustavo, was born.

2000: Four medals in three Olympics 
The 2000 Summer Olympics in Sydney saw Borges' last Olympic podium finish, when along with Edvaldo Valério, Carlos Jayme and Fernando Scherer, he won the bronze in the 4×100-meter freestyle with a time of 3:17.40. Australia broke the world record and took the gold with a time of 3:13.67. Borges also participated in the 100-meter freestyle, finishing in 16th position. During the Games, Gustavo was chosen by FINA to be part of a team of 12 athletes who would form a committee from 2000 to 2005. He was the only South American representative on the list. Brazil became one of the countries with a large representation within the Federation. Also in 2000, Borges started preparing to end his career and become an entrepreneur.

2002: The last world medal 
At the 2002 FINA World Swimming Championships (25 m) in Moscow, Borges won a silver in the 200-meter freestyle; it was his last FINA world medal. He also finished fourth in the 4×200-meter freestyle, with a time of  0.4s, which won him the bronze medal. Borges was in fifth place in the 4×100-meter freestyle, seventh place in the 100-metre freestyle and seventh place in the 4×100-metre medley In this tournament, Borges brokefor the last time in his careerthe South American record in short course in the 4×200-meter freestyle, with a time of 7:09.14, and in the 4×100-meter medley with 3:35.59.

2003: Last Pan 
In July, at the 2003 World Aquatics Championships in Barcelona, Borges was in the 4×100-meter freestyle team, which finished in 12th place' He was also in teams for the 4×200-meter freestylewhich finished ninth and the 4×100-meter medleywhich finished 17th.

In August 2003 at the age of 30, Borges took part in the 2003 Pan American Gameshis fourth and final Pan American Gameswhich were held in Santo Domingo. He established himself as the greatest Brazilian medalist in the history of the tournament, having won 19 podium finishes, eight gold medals, eight silver and three bronze. In these Games, Borges helped Brazil's swimming team to win 21 medalsa record. Borges won gold in the 4×100-meter freestyle, silver in 4×200-meter freestyle, and bronze in the 100-meter freestyle.

Also in 2003, Borges launches a book titled "Lessons from the water". He also became an entrepreneur, managing the Gustavo Borges Natação e Fitness in Curitiba.

2004: Retirement from professional swimming 

At the age of 31, Borges retired from swimming after competing in the 2004 Summer Olympics in Athens. His only event was the qualifying for the 4×100-meter freestyle, in which Brazil finished in 12th place and did not reach the finals. Having previously missed four opening ceremonies due to swimming contests the next day, and never witnessing any Brazilian medal other than Scherer in 1996, Borges decided to watch the rest of the Olympics, and was Brazil's flag bearer at the closing ceremony.

Hall of Fame 
In 2012, Borges joined the International Swimming Hall of Fame, becoming the second Brazilian to be honored by the institution – the first was Maria Lenk in 1988.

Records  
Gustavo Borges is the former holder of the following records:

See also
 List of Olympic medalists in swimming (men)
 List of University of Michigan alumni
 Pan American Games records in swimming
 South American records in swimming
 World record progression 100 metres freestyle

References

External links
  

1972 births
Olympic swimmers of Brazil
Living people
Michigan Wolverines men's swimmers
People from Ribeirão Preto
Swimmers at the 1992 Summer Olympics
Swimmers at the 1996 Summer Olympics
Swimmers at the 2000 Summer Olympics
Swimmers at the 1991 Pan American Games
Swimmers at the 1995 Pan American Games
Swimmers at the 1999 Pan American Games
Swimmers at the 2003 Pan American Games
Swimmers at the 2004 Summer Olympics
Olympic silver medalists for Brazil
Olympic bronze medalists for Brazil
World record setters in swimming
Olympic bronze medalists in swimming
Brazilian male freestyle swimmers
World Aquatics Championships medalists in swimming
Medalists at the FINA World Swimming Championships (25 m)
Medalists at the 2000 Summer Olympics
Medalists at the 1996 Summer Olympics
Medalists at the 1992 Summer Olympics
Pan American Games gold medalists for Brazil
Olympic silver medalists in swimming
Pan American Games medalists in swimming
Universiade medalists in swimming
Universiade silver medalists for Brazil
Medalists at the 1995 Summer Universiade
Medalists at the 1991 Pan American Games
Medalists at the 1995 Pan American Games
Medalists at the 1999 Pan American Games
Medalists at the 2003 Pan American Games
Sportspeople from São Paulo (state)
People from Ituverava